The year 1996 is the fourth year in the history of Pancrase, a mixed martial arts promotion based in Japan. In 1996 Pancrase held 13 events beginning with Pancrase: Truth 1.

Title fights

Events list

Pancrase: Truth 1

Pancrase: Truth 1 was an event held on January 28, 1996, at the Yokohama Cultural Gymnasium in Yokohama, Kanagawa, Japan.

Results

Pancrase: Truth 2

Pancrase: Truth 2 was an event held on March 2, 1996, at the Kobe Fashion Mart in Kobe, Hyogo, Japan.

Results

Pancrase: Truth 3

Pancrase: Truth 3 was an event held on April 7, 1996, at Korakuen Hall in Tokyo, Japan.

Results

Pancrase: Truth 4

Pancrase: Truth 4 was an event held on April 7, 1996, at Korakuen Hall in Tokyo, Japan.

Results

Pancrase: Truth 5

Pancrase: Truth 5 was an event held on May 16, 1996, at Nippon Budokan in Tokyo, Japan.

Results

Pancrase: Truth 6

Pancrase: Truth 6 was an event held on June 25, 1996, at Fukuoka Convention Center in Fukuoka, Fukuoka, Japan.

Results

Pancrase: 1996 Neo-Blood Tournament, Round 1

Pancrase: 1996 Neo-Blood Tournament, Round 1 was an event held on July 22, 1996, at Korakuen Hall in Tokyo, Japan.

Results

Pancrase: 1996 Neo-Blood Tournament, Round 2

Pancrase: 1996 Neo-Blood Tournament, Round 2 was an event held on July 23, 1996, at Korakuen Hall in Tokyo, Japan.

Results

Pancrase: 1996 Anniversary Show

Pancrase: 1996 Anniversary Show was an event held on September 7, 1996, at Tokyo Bay NK Hall in Urayasu, Chiba, Japan.

Results

Pancrase: Truth 7

Pancrase: Truth 7 was an event held on October 8, 1996, at the Tsuyuhashi Sport Center in Nagoya, Aichi, Japan.

Results

Pancrase: Truth 8

Pancrase: Truth 8 was an event held on October 22, 1996, at Korakuen Hall in Tokyo, Japan.

Results

Pancrase: Truth 9

Pancrase: Truth 9 was an event held on November 9, 1996, at the Kobe Fashion Mart in Kobe, Hyogo, Japan.

Results

Pancrase: Truth 10

Pancrase: Truth 10 was an event held on December 15, 1996, at the Japanese Martial Arts Building in Tokyo, Japan.

Results

See also 
 Pancrase
 List of Pancrase champions
 List of Pancrase events

References

Pancrase events
1996 in mixed martial arts